Kosiorów  is a village in the administrative district of Gmina Wilków, within Opole Lubelskie County, Lublin Voivodeship, in eastern Poland.

References

Villages in Opole Lubelskie County